Antigone, also known as The Antigone of Sophocles, is an adaptation by the German dramatist Bertolt Brecht of Hölderlin's translation of Sophocles' tragedy. It was first performed at the Chur Stadttheater in Switzerland in 1948, with Brecht's second wife Helene Weigel, in the lead role. This was Brecht's first directorial collaboration with Caspar Neher.

Productions
Ratan Thiyam directed a Meitei language-adaptation of the play in 1986.

A 1951 production of Antigone at the Griez showed a new prologue written by Brecht in which Antigone, Tiresias, and Creon appear onstage and Tiresias gives an explication of the play. He instructs the audience to analyze the play and observe how humanity rose up against barbarism.

Differences from the original Antigone

The play begins with a modern World War II scene in which two sisters discover that their brother, a soldier, has returned from the front. They feed him but it turns out that he is a deserter and he is lynched from the lamppost. This first scene is intended to draw the parallel between the death of Polynices, that marks the first and dramatically key event in Sophocles' Antigone, with that of the deserting soldier in World War II.

Creon is played as a Nazi-style dictator, and the cast in most productions wear either modern or World War II German costume to make the parallel more obvious.

Theatrical style

Cultural influences
 Die Antigone des Sophokles nach der Hölderlinschen Übertragung für die Bühne bearbeitet von Brecht 1948 (1992), a film from Straub-Huillet.

References

Educational Theatre Journal, Vol. 24, No. 1 (Mar., 1972), pp. 47–68

The Tulane Drama Review, Vol. 2, No. 1 (Nov., 1957), pp. 39–45

Plays by Bertolt Brecht
1947 plays
Plays based on Antigone (Sophocles play)
Modern adaptations of Antigone (Sophocles play)